The aftermath of the Winter War covers historical events and comments after the Winter War between Finland and the Soviet Union from 30 November 1939 to 13 March 1940. The short period after the war and before the next, the Continuation War, is known as the Interim Peace.

After the war

Finnish views
The 105-day war had a profound and depressing effect in Finland. Useful international support was minimal, arrived late, and the German blockade prevented most armament shipments. The state of the Finnish Army on the Karelian Isthmus at the end of the war has been the subject of debate. Orders were already given to prepare a retreat to the next line of defence in the Taipale sector. Estimates of how long the enemy could have been held in these kinds of retreat-and-stand operations varied from a few days to a couple of months, most averaging around a few weeks. During the Interim Peace, Karelian local governments, parishes and provincial organizations established Karjalan Liitto, an interest group, in order to defend the rights and interests of Karelian evacuees and to find a solution for returning Karelia.

Soviet views
During the period between the war and the perestroika in late 1980s, Soviet historiography leaned solely on Vyacheslav Molotov's speeches on the Winter War. In his radio speech of 29 November 1939, Molotov argued that the Soviet Union had tried for two months to negotiate guarantees of security for Leningrad. However, the Finns had taken a hostile stance to "please foreign imperialists". The Finns had undertaken military provocation and the Soviets could no longer hold to nonaggression pacts. According to Molotov, the Soviets did not want to occupy or annex Finland; the goal was purely to secure Leningrad.

Another source, later used widely in Soviet historiography, was the Molotov speech in front of the Supreme Soviet on 29 March 1940. Molotov blamed Western countries for starting the war and argued that they had used Finland as a proxy to fight the Soviet Union. The Western Allies had furthermore tried to take neutral Sweden and Norway along with them. The main "villains" for the Soviets were the United Kingdom and France, but also Sweden, the United States, and Italy, who had issued massive amounts of matériel, money, and numbers of men, to Finland. According to Molotov, the Soviet Union was merciful in peace terms, as the problem of Leningrad security had been solved.

It is speculated that Stalin had practically wiped out his intelligence apparatus during the purges, thus damaging the effectiveness of spies in Finland and other countries, as well as cowing operatives into writing the kind of reports they thought Stalin wanted to read.  Thus, he was not aware of the real situation in Finland and amongst the Allies. Soviet intelligence sources were informing their leadership of Allied plans to intervene in the war, but not of the details or the Allies' actual unpreparedness. Therefore, the Soviets felt forced to seek a premature end to the war before the Allies intervened and declared war on the Soviet Union.

In 1948, Stalin wrote in Falsifiers of History that "there could hardly be any doubt that the leading circles of Finland were in league with the Hitlerites and that they wanted to turn Finland into a springboard for Hitler Germany's attack on the U.S.S.R." Regarding the start of the war, Stalin also wrote, "In the war which the Finnish reactionaries started against the Soviet Union, Britain and France rendered the Finnish militarists every kind of assistance. The Anglo-French ruling circles kept inciting the Finnish Government to continue hostilities."

Nikita Khrushchev, who had been a party leader during the war, remembered later on: "In our war against the Finns we had an opportunity to choose the time and the place. We outnumbered our enemy, and we had all the time in the world to prepare for our operation. Yet even in these most favorable conditions it was only after great difficulty and enormous losses that we were finally able to win. A victory at such a cost was actually a moral defeat. Our people never knew that we had suffered a moral defeat, of course, because they were never told the truth. All of us—and Stalin first and foremost—sensed in our victory a defeat by the Finns. It was a dangerous defeat because it encouraged our enemies' conviction that the Soviet Union was a colossus with feet of clay."

In 1994, the President of Russia, Boris Yeltsin, denounced the Winter War, agreeing that it was a war of aggression.

Germany
The Winter War was a success for the Germans. Both the Red Army and the League of Nations were humiliated and furthermore, the Allied Supreme War Council had been revealed to be chaotic and powerless. However, the German policy of neutrality was not popular in the homeland and relations with Italy had also suffered badly. After the Peace of Moscow, the Germans did not hesitate to move to improve ties, and within two weeks, Finno-German relations were at the top of the agenda.

During the Interim Peace, the Finns gradually moved closer to Germany to fend off the perceived Soviet aggression and the Soviet interference into the Finnish domestic politics. Later Finland came to perceive the co-operation with Germany as a chance to reclaim areas ceded to the Soviet Union. Two days after the beginning of Operation Barbarossa, Soviet–Finnish hostilities resumed with start of the Continuation War.

Western Allies
The Winter War put in question the organisation and effectiveness of not only the Red Army, but also that of the Western Allies. The Supreme War Council did not manage its way through the situation, but revealed its total unsuitability to make effective war in either Britain or France. This failure led to the collapse of the Daladier government in France, and later, after the failure in the Norwegian Campaign, the fall of Chamberlain government in the United Kingdom.

Military consequences
The Supreme Military Soviet met in April 1940, sifted through the lessons of the Finnish campaign, and recommended reforms. The role of frontline political commissars was reduced and old-fashioned ranks and forms of discipline were reintroduced. Clothing, equipment and tactics for winter operations were improved. However, not all of these reforms had been completed when the Germans started Operation Barbarossa fourteen months later.

In the summer of 1940, the Soviet Union occupied the Baltic states of Estonia, Latvia, and Lithuania. Finland aimed to improve its defensive capabilities and conducted negotiations with Sweden regarding a military alliance, but negotiations ended once it became clear that both Germany and the Soviet Union opposed such an alliance. On 31 July 1940, German Chancellor Adolf Hitler gave the order to plan an assault on the Soviet Union, meaning that Germany had to reassess its position regarding Finland. Until then, Germany had rejected Finnish appeals to purchase arms, but with the prospect of an invasion of Russia, this policy was reversed, and in August the secret sale of weapons to Finland was permitted.

Karelian evacuees established an interest group, the Finnish Karelian League, to defend Karelian rights and interests, and to find a way to return ceded regions of Karelia to Finland. Finland wished to re-enter World War II mainly because of the Soviet invasion of Finland during the Winter War – which had taken place after Finland's reliance on the League of Nations and Nordic neutrality in order to avoid conflict had failed. Finland primarily aimed to reverse its territorial losses from the Moscow Peace Treaty and, depending on the success of the German invasion of the Soviet Union, to possibly expand its borders, especially into East Karelia. Some right-wing groups, such as the Academic Karelia Society, supported a Greater Finland ideology. The Continuation War began in June 1941, leading to Finnish participation in the siege of Leningrad as well as the Finnish occupation of East Karelia.

Casualties of the war
During the four months of fighting, the Soviet Army suffered massive losses. One Red Army General, looking at a map of the territory just conquered, is said to have remarked: "We have won just about enough ground to bury our dead." The official Soviet figure, issued just after the war, listed 48,745 dead and 150,863 wounded.

According to Nikita Khrushchev, 1.5 million men were sent to Finland and one million of them were killed, while 1,000 aircraft, 2,300 tanks and armored cars and an enormous amount of other war materials were lost. Finland's losses were limited to 25,904 dead or missing and 43,557 wounded.

In 1990, professor Mikhail Semiryaga used the Red Army Casualty Notifications to publish a book in which he gave exact figures: 53,522 dead, 16,208 missing, 163,772 wounded and 12,064 frostbitten. Meanwhile, professor N. I. Baryshikov estimated 53,500 dead, a figure close to that of Semiryaga. In 1999, Finnish historian Ohto Manninen estimated Red Army casualties to have been 84,994 dead or prisoners, 186,584 wounded or disabled, 51,892 sick and 9,614 frostbitten. Russian historian Grigoriy Krivosheyev calculated 126,875 dead and 264,908 wounded. In 1999, Yuri Kilin, professor at Petrozavodsk State University, calculated 63,990 dead, and 207,538 wounded and frostbitten, making total casualties 271,528. A further 58,390 men were tagged as sick. In 2007, he revised the estimate of dead to 134,000 and in 2012, he updated the estimate to 138,533. In 2013, Pavel Petrov stated that the Russian State Military Archive has a database confirming 167,976 killed or missing along with the soldiers' names, dates of birth and ranks.

Contemporary views

Soviet literature
The Winter War was one of the first modern wars of the Red Army before Nazi Germany's Barbarossa in June 1941. In the Soviet Union, the Winter War was called the "Soviet-Finnish War", and later the term "Border Skirmish" was also used. In different periods the Soviet literature gave different answers for basic questions of the motive of the war, who started the war, whether it could have been avoided, and the result. The most important aspect was the motive.

The first motive of the war, presented by the Soviets, was to assist the Finnish working-class people against the tyranny of the White Finns. The root was the Finnish Civil War in which thousands of Red Guards were killed, and the many communist leaders were expatriated from Finland to the Soviet Union. The motive did not work as the Finnish working-class stood by its legal government in Helsinki. The Soviets abandoned this motive at the end of the December 1939.

The new motive was introduced by the Stavka at turn of the year. Now, the protection of Leningrad and North-East of the area was the main motive. During winter 1940 the British and the France planned intervention, which Soviet propaganda used to show that the Western imperialists were willing to use Finland as springboard against the "Socialist Motherland". After the Nazi Germany assault against the Soviet Union, the literature changed its course. Now, the main villain of the Winter War was Germany. The Finns had sold their country to Hitler, and for years they had planned the attack against the Soviet Union. Furthermore, the Soviet literature argued that the Mannerheim Line was built on Germany's initiative and using its experts.

During the Cold War, the main villain changed again. Now, the United States was the head of an alliance whose other participants were the United Kingdom, France, and Nazi Germany. The Mannerheim Line was given funding from the United Kingdom, France, Sweden, Germany and the United States, and also in years 1938–1939 the Swedish, British and German generals visited and monitored construction work. These multinational contributions demonstrated that Finland was preparing the assault against the Soviet Union with "any military alliance possible".

Russian literature
During the years of perestroika and glasnost, the Soviet historiography began to write new views of its history. Rendition of Winter War studies had its breakthrough when the Soviet historian Mikhail Semiryaga wrote an article for the weekly magazine Ogoniok in 1989. It was the first time the public read that the Winter War was a real war, not just a conflict, and that the Soviet government had had to deploy a large number of men and amount of matériel. Furthermore, Semiryaga wrote that the Soviets began their troop deployments in the spring of 1939. Later he wrote an article in which he revealed that the goal of the Red Army was not just to secure Leningrad, but to conquer the whole of Finland.

In the 1990s and 2000s, especially after the Moscow Archives opened, there have been hundreds of articles considering the Winter War. However, only dozens of monographs have been published. Due to the language barrier, most Russian historians have not exploited Finnish writings and sources.

In the early 1990s there was the beginning of a transition in which old Soviet views were mixed with modern ones. The Soviet diplomat and KGB-agent in Helsinki Viktor Vladimirov wrote Kohti talvisotaa in 1995, a book in which he admitted that the Shelling of Mainila was a Soviet provocation, but insisted that the Finns had an assault plan against the Soviet Union; that Finland was under German influence; and that the Winter War was necessary to secure the city of Leningrad. In 1998, a group of Finnish-Russian historians published a book called Zimnyaya voina 1939–1940. It was a collection of different historical articles, and the book was published a year earlier in Finnish.

Due to a general economic upturn in the early 2000s, commercial war literature publishing became popular again. Pavel Aptekar wrote Tainy finskoi voiny in 2000 and Sovetsko-finskiye voiny in 2004, in which he emphasized the Finnish side and describes the Soviet assault as "immoral". In 2003, Pavel Petrov and Viktor Stepakov wrote a 542-page long book called Sovetsko-finlandsjaya voina 1939–1940, in which they negate the myth of a major Nazi-German influence on Finnish foreign policy, and demonstrate that the United Kingdom had a bigger role. However, more "traditional" literature has also been published, such as Rozdeniye i krah by Nikolai Baryshnikov and Vladimir Baryshikov in 2000. The authors revive Soviet views, and for example are not sure which party started the Shelling of Mainila. The book was also published in Finnish by the Johan Beckman Institute.

Finnish literature
During the age of Finlandization, the Finnish president Urho Kekkonen gave a speech in April 1973 in which he stated that Winter War was unnecessary. This view was received positively in the Kremlin and among the Finnish leftists. Similar opinions were presented by the Swedish prime minister Tage Erlander and Finnish novelist Väinö Linna. Kekkonen's views were objected to as the Winter War was traditionally beyond criticism in Finnish society. However the Continuation War could be criticized openly in the 1970s.

The 50th anniversary of the Winter War started a new era in 1989. At the same year the film Talvisota (Winter War) was released which was the most expensive Finnish movie at the time. At the beginning of the 1990s the atmosphere changed. The Soviet Union collapsed and Moscow Archives opened revealing new information about the Winter War. The Finns openly showed their respect for the Finnish soldiers of three wars in 1939–1944; the situation would have been impossible in the 1970s. In the 2004 television programme Suuret suomalaiset (Great Finns) the Finns voted three World War II persons in the top four: Carl Gustaf Emil Mannerheim (1st), Risto Ryti (2nd), and Adolf Ehrnrooth (4th).

Possible Sovietisation and resettlement
In the years since the Winter War, there has been speculation surrounding Finnish–Soviet negotiations during 1938 and 1939. The question has been raised whether the Winter War could have been avoided had Finland agreed to Soviet demands for bases and to conclude the friendship, cooperation and mutual assistance treaty between countries. Estonia, Latvia and Lithuania had agreed to Soviet demands and a year later were occupied and annexed. Could Finland have been an exception?

According to Finnish historian Timo Vihavainen, there are many arguments against this speculation. Stalin trusted only the Red Army, and he used it to consolidate his control of neighbouring countries. Pieces of paper like nonaggression pacts interested him little. Neutrality, when it ran counter to the interests of the Soviet Union, was "objectively" its opposite and therefore served the interests of Germany. The Soviet Union accused Finland of being under total German influence in 1930s. In reality, the general attitude of Finland towards Germany and the Soviet Union was overwhelmingly negative.

It has also come into question whether the Soviet intent was to occupy all of Finland or just strategic areas near Leningrad. According to the document approved in 1939 by Zhdanov, Molotov, and Kuusinen, the Finnish political system was meant to be changed after the Soviet occupation by establishing a "people's republic" and capturing "enemies of the state". Marshal Ivan Konev wrote that he was informed of a conversation between Stalin, Kliment Voroshilov, and Ivan Isakov. Stalin said in the beginning of the Winter War: "We shall have to resettle the Finns... the population of Finland is smaller than that of Leningrad, they can be resettled."

References

Citations

Bibliography

 
 
 
 
 
 
 
 
 
 
 
 
 
 
 
 
 
 

Aftermath
Aftermath of wars
Aftermath of World War II in the Soviet Union
Chronology of World War II
1940 in Finland
1940 in the Soviet Union